Deborah L. Turbiville (born August 19, 1975; dubbed the Memorial Madam by the news media) operated the Vivian's Friends brothel and escort agency in Houston, Texas under the pseudonym Vivian. On March 10, 2009, after an investigation that began in October 2007, Deborah was arrested and charged with aggravated promotion of prostitution and money laundering. Turbiville is a native of Belize and was raised in England. She has a master's degree in psychology.

Prostitution ring
For four to seven years, Turbiville operated what may have been the largest prostitution ring in Houston. Turbiville had dozens of employees, including 30 prostitutes, and 700 to 1500 male and female clients. According to Houston attorney Terry Yates, "If there's a trial or some contested issue those names are likely to become public." According to Harris County Assistant District Attorney Donna Hawkins, the clients may be questioned and charged. Her operation catered to "high rollers" and "big players" and screened prospective clients with P411, a prostitution screening service to detect law enforcement. Her clientele included doctors, lawyers, professional athletes, and television personalities. Clients paid up to $350 per hour, $250 of which prostitutes kept.

The ring operated out of the 9900 Memorial Apartments, a 706 unit luxury apartment complex, and out of Uptown District–area hotels. Turbiville operated under the cover of Turbiville LLC, a supposed international investment company, Logic Moving Solutions LLC, Wazala.com LLC, and Alquima Properties.

Houston Police Department Sergeant Mark Kilty labeled her "the Heidi Fleiss of Houston" and said that "[s]he probably had the biggest escort service in Houston." According to a prostitute who formerly worked for her, Turbiville operated "the largest prostitution escort service operating in the city of Houston."

Arrest
HPD arrested Turbiville on March 10, 2009. They seized two safes containing "a substantial amount" of cash, gold, and silver, a Lexus sedan, a Chevrolet SUV, a pistol, and several computers. HPD is currently performing computer forensics on them in order to build a list of clients. Police seized business records, condoms, and lubricants from the apartment.

References

External links
 Search and arrest warrant
 LinkedIn profile
 Vivian's Blog (offline)
 Houston Girlfriend (offline)
 Vivian's Friends (offline)

American brothel owners and madams
American money launderers
1975 births
Living people